The Rural Municipality of Pittville No. 169 is a rural municipality (RM) in the Canadian province of Saskatchewan within Census Division No. 8 and  Division No. 3. Located in the southwest portion of the province, it is northwest of the town of Gull Lake.

History 
The RM of Pittville No. 169 incorporated as a rural municipality on January 1, 1913.

Geography

Communities and localities 
The following urban municipalities are surrounded by the RM.

Villages
Hazlet

The following unincorporated communities are located in the RM.

Localities
Nadeauville
Roadene
Roseray
Verlo

Parks and recreation 
Hazlet Regional Park

Demographics 

Government 
The RM of Pittville No. 169 is governed by an elected municipal council and an appointed administrator that meets on the second Tuesday of every month. The reeve of the RM is Larry Sletten while its administrator is Terry Erdelyan. The RM's office is located in Hazlet.

Standing Rock 
Standing Rock is a large glacial erratic left from the last ice age around 14,000 years ago. It was used as a scratching post for bison for centuries, and as a landmark by First Nations and later on by early settlers. It is a recorded petrograph site and is now a historical site.

Transportation 
Highways within the RM include:
Highway 332
Highway 633
Highway 728

See also 
List of rural municipalities in Saskatchewan

References

P